Benjamin Desroches is a French professional rugby union player. He plays at lock for Castres in the Top 14.

References

External links
Ligue Nationale De Rugby Profile
European Professional Club Rugby Profile

French rugby union players
Living people
1989 births
Place of birth missing (living people)
Rugby union locks